No! No! A Thousand Times No!! is a 1935 Fleischer Studio animated short film, starring Betty Boop.

This is the third of a series of Betty Boop melodrama spoofs, which also included She Wronged Him Right (1934), Betty Boop's Prize Show (1935) and Honest Love and True (1938).

Synopsis
Betty is performing on-stage with her boyfriend, Freddy, in an old-fashioned melodrama, complete with mustachioed villain. The vile fiend, after tying up the hero, tempts Betty with diamonds and fur, but she replies by singing the title song. The villain kidnaps Betty and escapes in his balloon, but is eventually caught by Freddy and forced to release Betty.

Song
The title song was written by Al Sherman, Al Lewis, Abner Silver in 1934, and sung by Mae Questel. The song was covered by Percival Mackey and his Orchestra featuring a vocal by Bobbie Comber in October of the same year. It was again covered in the 1960s by Beatrice Kay.

References

External links

 No! No! A Thousand Times No!! at the Big Cartoon Database.
 No! No! A Thousand Times No!! on YouTube.
 

Songs written for films
Songs written by Al Sherman
Songs written by Al Lewis (lyricist)
Songs written by Abner Silver
Short films directed by Dave Fleischer
1934 songs
Betty Boop cartoons
1935 films
1935 animated films
Paramount Pictures short films
Fleischer Studios short films
American black-and-white films
1930s American films